Enduro is a form of motorcycle sport run on courses that are predominantly off-road.

Enduro may also refer to:

Sports
 Enduro motorcycle, a motorcycle specially made for the Enduro sport
 Motorcycle oil line up from Pertamina
 Enduro (mountain biking), a form of mountain-bike competition
 Enduro race, a type of automobile stock car racing
 Enduro rock climbing, a form of rock climbing involving highly technical, committing and enduring moves.

Other
 Beaujon Enduro, a single-seat, ultralight aircraft that entered production in 1978
 Enduro (video game), a videogame published in 1983 for the Atari 2600
 Enduro Racer, an arcade game released in 1986
 Schmidtler Enduro, a German ultralight trike design
 AMD Enduro, a technology for use with mobile computing platforms

See also 
 Endura (disambiguation)